Kabutochō or more formally Nihonbashi Kabutochō is a neighborhood of Nihonbashi, Chuo-ku, Tokyo, where the Tokyo Stock Exchange and many securities companies are located, so that it is considered Japan's equivalent of Wall Street in New York City.

History
The name of Kabutochō, literally the town of Kabuto (ancient helmet), is said to come from a legend that Minamoto no Yoshiie, upon his return from having conquered the north-eastern provinces in the eleventh century, buried his helmet there. It used to be a swampy area till the early 17th century, when the Daimyo who were forced to participate in the building of the Edo Castle built their residences.

By the Meiji period, the Kabutochō area came to be owned by the Mitsui family. In 1871, Eiichi Shibusawa established First National Bank there that later would become Mizuho Bank. As the Tokyo Stock Exchange was established there in 1878, the area soon became Japan's financial center, with many securities companies and banks setting up their headquarters and/or branch offices.

Revitalization
Recently, as securities trading has become electronic, larger securities firms have already left Kabutochō to other premier locations in Tokyo. Heiwa Real Estate, the owner of the Tokyo Stock Exchange and Osaka Exchange buildings, has kicked off a Kabutochō Revitalization project. In 2020 Time Out named Kabutochō as the coolest neighborhood in Tokyo.

Education

Public elementary and junior high schools are operated by Chuo City Board of Education.

Kabutocho is zoned to Sakamoto Elementary School (中央区立阪本小学校) and Nihonbashi Junior High School (日本橋中学校).

See also
Tokyo Stock Exchange

References

External links

Official site of Chuo-ku, Tokyo (in Japanese)
The town that developed with Japan’s financial economy (Nihonbashi-tokyo.com)

Nihonbashi, Tokyo
Chūō, Tokyo
Neighborhoods of Tokyo
Financial districts
Tokyo Stock Exchange